WHTU (103.9 MHz) is a commercial FM radio station licensed to Big Island, Virginia, and serving the Lynchburg metropolitan area. WHTU broadcasts a classic hits radio format and is owned by Gary Burns' Three Daughters Media, through licensee KSM Holdings, LLC.  The studios and offices are off Forest Road in Forest, Virginia.

WHTU has an effective radiated power (ERP) of 190 watts as a Class A station.  The transmitter is near Sweet Hollow Road in Forest, Virginia.

History
Its original call sign was WXCF-FM, the sister station to WXCF 1230 AM in Clifton Forge, Virginia.

On November 2, 2012, WXCF-FM split from its simulcast with WKHF and changed its format to Urban Adult Contemporary, branded as "Hot 103.9". On December 12, 2012, WXCF-FM changed its call letters to WHTU to go with the "Hot 103.9" branding.

On June 2, 2014, WHTU changed its format to Oldies and Classic Hits, branded as "Good Time Oldies 103.9", with programming from Westwood One's "Good Time Oldies" network. The branding was later shortened to "Oldies 103.9". In August 2015, WHTU began simulcasting on sister station WZZI at 106.9 FM.  That station was later sold to the Educational Media Foundation for its "K-Love" Christian Contemporary format.

On May 31, 2022, WHTU rebranded as "Rewind 103.9".

Previous logo

References

External links
Rewind 103.9 Online

1982 establishments in Virginia
Classic hits radio stations in the United States
Radio stations established in 1982
HTU